Joseph Baratta is an American business executive who is Global Head of Private Equity at Blackstone, a New York-based global asset management giant.

Early life 
Born in Sacramento, California, Baratta graduated from Jesuit High School in the Sacramento area in 1989, then Georgetown University, from which he graduated magna cum laude in 1993.

Career 
Baratta joined Blackstone in 1998. He moved to London in 2001 to establish Blackstone’s private equity business in Europe. In 2004 he became a Senior Managing Director of the firm and Head of European Private Equity in 2010. In July 2012 he was named the Global Head of Private Equity.

He has led some of Blackstone’s most successful investments like SeaWorld Parks and Entertainment, Merlin Entertainments (the owner of the Legoland theme parks, the London Eye, Madame Tussauds and many other well known visitor attractions), Center Parcs and Southern Cross.  Before joining Blackstone, Baratta worked for investment firms Tinicum Incorporated and McCown De Leeuw & Company. He also worked in the mergers and acquisitions department at Morgan Stanley.

In 2012, Baratta was listed in Forbes “Top 50 Dealmakers” list.

Baratta currently serves as a Director of Ancestry, Merlin Entertainments and SESAC. He has previously served as a member or observer on the boards of ICS Group, Tragus Group, Center Parcs, Universal Orlando, Nycomed Holding ApS, Spirit Group, Southern Cross, and Refinitiv.

He serves on the Advisory Board of the McDonough School of Business. He also sits on the Board of Directors at Georgetown University, his alma mater.

Philanthropy 
Baratta is on the board of Year Up, an organization committed to closing the opportunity divide by ensuring that young adults gain the skills, experiences, and support that will empower them to reach their potential through careers and higher education.

See also 
The Blackstone Group
Stephen A. Schwarzman

References

1971 births
Living people
People from Sacramento, California
Georgetown University alumni
Businesspeople from New York (state)